Brian Lane may refer to:

 Brian Lane (RAF officer) (1917–1942), Royal Air Force officer and fighter ace in World War II
 Brian Lane, musician in the band Brand New
 Brian Lane (New Tricks), a fictional character in the British TV detective series New Tricks
 Brian Lane (manager), former band manager of Yes and a-ha
 Bryan Lane (footballer) (born 1936), Australian footballer

See also
Brian Lane Green (born 1962), American stage, film and television actor